The second season of the American science fiction horror drama television series Stranger Things, was released worldwide on the streaming service Netflix on October 27, 2017. The series was created by the Duffer Brothers, who also serve as executive producers along with Shawn Levy, Dan Cohen and Iain Paterson.

This season stars Winona Ryder, David Harbour, Finn Wolfhard, Millie Bobby Brown, Gaten Matarazzo, Caleb McLaughlin, Noah Schnapp, Sadie Sink, Natalia Dyer, Charlie Heaton, Joe Keery, Dacre Montgomery, Cara Buono, Sean Astin and Paul Reiser. Brett Gelman, Linnea Berthelsen, Matthew Modine, and Priah Ferguson also appear in recurring roles. The season received highly positive reviews, particularly for its story, character development, production values, visual effects, acting (particularly that of Harbour, Brown, Schnapp, Keery, and Astin), and darker tone compared to the previous season.

Premise
In the fall of 1984, one year after his disappearance, Will Byers finds himself the target of the Upside Down as a large tentacled entity called the Mind Flayer terrorizes the citizens of Hawkins and possesses him. Will's family and friends alongside Jim Hopper, Mike's sister Nancy, Nancy's boyfriend Steve Harrington, Californian newcomer Max Mayfield and a missing Eleven, must join forces to contain the threat.

Cast and characters

Main
 Winona Ryder as Joyce Byers
 David Harbour as Jim Hopper
 Finn Wolfhard as Mike Wheeler
 Millie Bobby Brown as Eleven / Jane Ives / Jane Hopper
 Gaten Matarazzo as Dustin Henderson
 Caleb McLaughlin as Lucas Sinclair
 Noah Schnapp as Will Byers
 Sadie Sink as Max Mayfield
 Natalia Dyer as Nancy Wheeler
 Charlie Heaton as Jonathan Byers
 Joe Keery as Steve Harrington
 Dacre Montgomery as Billy Hargrove
 Cara Buono as Karen Wheeler
 Sean Astin as Bob Newby
 Paul Reiser as Sam Owens

Recurring
 Linnea Berthelsen as Kali / Eight
 Joe Chrest as Ted Wheeler
 Catherine Curtin as Claudia Henderson
 Priah Ferguson as Erica Sinclair
 Brett Gelman as Murray Bauman
 Karen Ceesay as Sue Sinclair
 Arnell Powell as Charles Sinclair
 Jennifer Marshall as Susan Hargrove
 Will Chase as Neil Hargrove 
 Tinsley and Anniston Price as Holly Wheeler
 Cynthia Barrett as Marsha Holland
 Chester Rushing as Tommy H
 Kai L. Greene as Funshine
 Randy Havens as Scott Clarke
 Susan Shalhoub Larkin as Florence 
 James Landry Hébert as Axel
 Anna Jacoby-Heron as Dottie
 Gabrielle Maiden as Mic
 Rob Morgan as Officer Powell
 John Paul Reynolds as Officer Callahan
 Chelsea Talmadge as Carol
 Madelyn Cline as Tina
 Abigail Cowen as Vicki 
 Matty Cardarople as Keith
 Tony Vaughn as Principal Coleman
 Charles Lawlor as Mr. Melvald  
 Aaron Muñoz as Mr. Holland 
 Pruitt Taylor Vince as Ray
 Matthew Modine as Martin Brenner

Episodes

Production

Development
With the critical and viewership success of Stranger Things after its first season's release in July 2016, speculation on a possible second season was raised. The Duffer Brothers initially intended for Stranger Things to either be a standalone miniseries or an anthology series. They also considered the possibility of setting a potential second season (which they referred to as a "sequel") in the early 1990s and featuring an older version of the characters, along with all-new characters, who are drawn back to Hawkins after supernatural events begin occurring again.

However, following the release of the first season, they realized that the likability of the characters – especially the children – was key to the series' success, and they decided to set the second season in 1984 and focus on the same characters. By the end of July, the Duffer Brothers had outlined a plan for such a season if it was green-lit, and Netflix's CEO Reed Hastings said in early August that the company "would be dumb not to" renew Stranger Things for a second season. On August 31, 2016, Netflix announced it had renewed Stranger Things for a second season of nine episodes, to be released in 2017. The Duffer Brothers revealed that the series had been renewed for a second season before the first was released. Regarding the decision to wait more than a month after the first season was released to announce the renewal, Matt Duffer said, "it actually ended up working because it had built up to this fever pitch. I guess that's what [Netflix] were intending to do all the time."

Writing
The success of the first season led the Duffers to let their writers' room propose any idea they could come up with out of desperation for ways to expand the show. However, Ross Duffer stated in the WGFestival 2022 that thanks to the writers proposing more ideas than necessary, they were forced to drop some. Several of the unused ideas for the season were later included in the fifth and final season. The Duffer Brothers wrote the second season to make the combined first and second season feel like a complete work, but set elements in place to go forward with additional seasons if they were green-lit. While most of the story for the second season had been decided before the first season aired, the Duffer Brothers took in the audience reactions from the first season to adjust some of the details within the second season. They knew they would not have the same element of audience surprise as when the series aired anew and were aware fans wanted to see certain elements, but Ross said "...the point is not to give everyone what they think they want. Because I don't think they really know what they want."

The Duffer Brothers felt that the second season should be treated more like a sequel rather than a continuation, and thus opted to call the second Stranger Things 2. This approach had some trepidation from Netflix, since the company felt movie sequels typically have a bad reputation, but the Duffer Brothers pointed out that there had been many successful sequels that surpassed the original film, and felt confident with this name. Despite revealing episode titles for the season in the announcement teaser in order "to provide some hint of where we were going in season two without giving anything away," Matt Duffer stated that some of the titles would change since there were some things "we didn't want to put on there because we felt like it would give too much away," and because "people are smart on the fucking internet" with fan-created "videos analyzing the chapter titles... right on a lot" of how the titles related to the plot of the season. In early October 2017, the Duffer Brothers revealed the final titles for the first six episodes of the season.

Casting
In October 2016, it was announced that Schnapp and Keery had been promoted to the main cast for the second season, after each recurring in the first season, and that Sadie Sink and Dacre Montgomery would join the main cast as Max and Billy, respectively. In order to get the role, Sink told to the crew while auditioning that she knew about rollerblading and skateboarding; Sink actually knew how to do the latter but not the former, reflecting years later during an appearance in Jimmy Kimmel Live why did she think lying would help her nail the part as the two things weren't quite the same as she thought. Ryder, Harbour, Wolfhard, Brown, Matarazzo, McLaughlin, Dyer and Heaton also return for the season. Sean Astin as Bob Newby and Paul Reiser as Sam Owens are also part of the main cast in the season. For Owens, The Duffer Brothers had referred to the character in their pitch to Netflix for the season as "Paul Reiser", and specifically alluded to Reiser's character Carter J. Burke in Aliens, with Ross referencing James Cameron's casting choice for that film, saying, "[Cameron] thought people would inherently trust [Reiser] and it would be a twist". Reiser's son was a fan of Stranger Things, and gave his father an early appreciation of the series so that by when the production called his agent about the role, Reiser was excited for the part. Joining them in recurring roles are Linnea Berthelsen as Kali / Eight and Brett Gelman as Murray Bauman.

Filming
In the first week of November 2016, table reads for the season started. The season was officially confirmed to be in production on November 4, 2016 in a social media post. It was accompanied by a photo of some of the cast members at a table read.

Filming of the season started on November 7, 2016. On November 14, 2016 photos of the cast on set in Atlanta were published. Seen in the photos were the main cast of kids and teens from the previous season, minus Millie Bobby Brown and Natalia Dyer, though who appeared to be a body double for Nancy was present. Chelsea Talmadge, who portrays the recurring character Carol, was also present. None of the new cast members were spotted, but the names Max and Billy were seen on the cast trailers, implying that newcomers Sadie Sink and Dacre Montgomery were present that day.

By early April, the final two episodes had commenced filming, shooting scenes in Woodland, Georgia seen previously in Season 1. Filming for the season officially wrapped on June 3, 2017.

Music 

The soundtrack album for the second season was released digitally on October 20, 2017, via Lakeshore and Invada Records. The soundtrack was composed by Kyle Dixon and Michael Stein of the electronic band Survive. On the soundtrack's composition, Dixon and Stein together said that the score for the season introduces "new styles of composition, while still revisiting old themes when appropriate ... We've created new elements that are necessary to support the story, but still want to remain true to the sound of Season 1." The first track from the soundtrack, "Walkin' in Hawkins", was released on October 12.

As was customary with the first season, the second season utilized period music primarily from the 1980s to evoke a sense of nostalgia amongst viewers while further solidifying the story's setting. In all, over fifty pieces of music were used for Stranger Things 2, with release dates spanning from 1936 all the way until 1985.

Release
The second season, which consisted of nine one-hour-long episodes, was released worldwide on Netflix on October 27, 2017, in Ultra HD 4K and HDR.

Marketing
A teaser for the second season, which also announced the release date, aired during Super Bowl LI.

Beyond Stranger Things 

With the release of the second season of the series, Netflix also released Beyond Stranger Things, an aftershow hosted by Jim Rash. The guests of the aftershow are composed of cast and crew from the series, including the Duffer Brothers and the series' stars, to discuss the development and behind-the-scenes production of the series and its larger mythology. Unlike previous after-shows created by Embassy Row, such as Talking Dead and Talking Bad, Beyond Stranger Things is intended to be watched after a screening of the entire current season.

Home media
The second season was released on a Blu-ray/DVD combo pack exclusively to Target retailers on November 6, 2018, in vintage CBS-FOX VHS-inspired packaging.

Reception

Audience viewership

Nielsen ratings
Nielsen ratings records viewership data for those who viewed the series on a TV set, the data does not account for mobile, tablet or PC devices.

Other data
The second season has been recognized by Parrot Analytics as the most in-demand digital original series of the world in 2017 and is included in the 2019 edition of Guinness World Records. In August 2017, the marketing analytics firm Jumpshot determined the season was the seventh-most viewed Netflix season in the first 30 days after it was released, garnering slightly more than 20% of the viewers that the second season of Daredevil received, which was the most viewed season according to Jumpshot. Jumpshot, which "analyzes click-stream data from an online panel of more than 100 million consumers", looked at the viewing behavior and activity of the company's U.S. members, factoring in the relative number of U.S. Netflix viewers who watched at least one episode of the season.

Critical response
On Rotten Tomatoes, the second season has an approval rating of 94% based on 146 reviews and an average rating of 7.86/10. The site's critical consensus states, "Stranger Things slow-building sophomore season balances moments of humor and a nostalgic sweetness against a growing horror that's all the more effective thanks to the show's full-bodied characters and evocative tone." On Metacritic, the second season has a normalized score of 78 out of 100, based on 33 critics, indicating "generally favorable reviews".

In a review for Rolling Stone, journalist David Fear praised the second season's character development, going so far as to say it shined more than the narrative: "...By the time you get to the John Hughes finale, in which the school's winter dance ties up numerous loose ends, you realize that Stranger Things 2 has not only been crafting a story about kids fumbling through and finding their way into young adulthood, but that those parts feel more interesting than any Upside Down, et al. shenanigans ... if the second season has anything on the first, it's that these characters now feel less like they stepped out of E.T. outtakes and more like the actual teens who were in the audience watching it and dreaming."

Linda Holmes of National Public Radio also praised the season's character development, saying in her review, "There is much to be grateful for in the work given to the returning cast. Dustin and Lucas have the opportunity to be fleshed out a bit more — which is especially welcome with Lucas, who wasn't given a lot of solo time in the first season to demonstrate exactly what role he plays in what Dustin calls the "party" made up of the boys and Eleven. Perhaps the most unexpectedly successful move on this front, though, is to continue to build out Steve beyond Obstacle Boyfriend, in part by giving him some contact with people besides Nancy to work with." 
Holmes also expressed misgiving, noting that the narrative structure was at times copying from the first season's plot line, but overall found this iteration to be enjoyable despite its shortcomings.

Commentary
One of the most notable impacts of the series has been an increased demand for Eggo waffles, as they are shown to be Eleven's favorite food in several episodes and are seen as a representation of the series. The Kellogg Company, which manufactures Eggo, had not been part of the production prior to the first season's release, but recognized the market impact of the series. It provided a vintage 1980s Eggo television advertisement for Netflix to use in its season two Super Bowl LI commercial, and is looking to become more involved with cross-promotion.

Accolades

References

External links
 
 

2
2017 American television seasons
Television series set in 1984
Television shows set in Pittsburgh